Sharon is an unincorporated community and census-designated place (CDP) in Jones County, Mississippi, United States. The population was 1,344 at the 2020 census. It is part of the Laurel micropolitan statistical area.

Geography
Sharon is in northeastern Jones County and is bordered to the north by Jasper County.

Demographics 

As of the 2020 United States census, there were 1,344 people, 591 households, and 505 families residing in the CDP.

References

Census-designated places in Mississippi
Census-designated places in Jones County, Mississippi